Zolotarivka is a village in eastern Ukraine, located in Sievierodonetsk Raion of Luhansk Oblast. It is close to Verkhnokamyanka and the Lysychansk Oil Refinery.

History 
During the Holodomor in 1932–33, at least 82 villagers were confirmed to have died from starvation.

During the Russo-Ukrainian War, the village was captured by Russian forces in early July 2022, but was reportly liberated by Ukrainian forces in mid-October.

Demographics 
The native language distribution of the population is as follows:

Ukrainian: 80.03%

Russian: 18.38%

Others: 0.32%

References 

 Погода в селі Золотарівка (Archived)

Villages in Sievierodonetsk Raion